The 2023 Copa CONMEBOL Sudamericana is the 22nd edition of the CONMEBOL Sudamericana (also referred to as the Copa Sudamericana), South America's secondary club football tournament organized by CONMEBOL.

The final will be played in Montevideo, Uruguay on 28 October 2023, as announced by CONMEBOL president Alejandro Domínguez on 8 March 2023.

The winners of the 2023 Copa Sudamericana will earn the right to play against the winners of the 2023 Copa Libertadores in the 2024 Recopa Sudamericana. They will also automatically qualify for the 2024 Copa Libertadores group stage.

Independiente del Valle are the titleholders, but since they qualified for the 2023 Copa Libertadores group stage as Copa Sudamericana champions, they will only be able to defend their title if they end in third place of their Copa Libertadores group.

Format changes
On 19 December 2022, CONMEBOL announced format changes to the Copa Sudamericana starting from this edition while maintaining the same number of matches to be played. The following changes were implemented:
The first stage of the tournament, where teams from all associations (except Argentina and Brazil) play against a team from their same association on a home-and-away two-legged basis, will be played on a single-leg format.
The eight group runner-ups will not be eliminated, but will instead play a play-off round prior to the round of 16 against the eight third-placed teams of the Copa Libertadores group stage, which previously advanced directly to the round of 16. The winners of this round will qualify for the round of 16 along with the Copa Sudamericana group winners.

Teams
The following 44 teams from the 10 CONMEBOL associations qualified for the tournament:
Argentina and Brazil: 6 berths each
All other associations: 4 berths each

The entry stage is determined as follows:
 Group stage: 12 teams (teams from Argentina and Brazil)
 First stage: 32 teams (teams from all other associations)

Notes

A further 12 teams eliminated from the 2023 Copa Libertadores will be transferred to the Copa Sudamericana, entering the group stage and the knockout round play-offs.

Schedule
The schedule of the competition is as follows:

Draws

The draw for the group stage will be held on 27 March 2023. Teams will be seeded by their CONMEBOL Clubs ranking as of 9 December 2022, with the four teams transferred from the 2023 Copa Libertadores being seeded into Pot 4. For the group stage, the 32 qualified teams will be drawn into eight groups (Groups A–H) of four containing a team from each of the four pots.

First stage

Group stage

The following 32 teams will be involved in the group stage (CONMEBOL Clubs ranking as of 9 December 2022 shown in parentheses):

Pot 1
 Peñarol (8)
 São Paulo (9)
 Santos (10)
 LDU Quito (21)
 Estudiantes (23)
 Emelec (29)
 San Lorenzo (31)
 Santa Fe (34)

Pot 2
 Defensa y Justicia (37)
 Guaraní (41)
 Red Bull Bragantino (45)
 Universitario (46)
 Deportes Tolima (47)
 Botafogo (59)
 Newell's Old Boys (61)
 Palestino (67)

Pot 3
 Oriente Petrolero (81)
 Estudiantes de Mérida (96)
 Danubio (103)
 Tigre (108)
 América Mineiro (118)
 Blooming (121)
 Goiás (136)
 Universidad César Vallejo (149)

Pot 4
 Audax Italiano (153)
 Gimnasia y Esgrima (162)
 Academia Puerto Cabello (232)
 Tacuary (No rank)
 Millonarios (57)
 Huracán (58)
 Fortaleza (78)
 Magallanes (215)

Notes

Statistics

Top scorers

{| class="wikitable" style="text-align:center; font-size:90%"
!Rank
!Player
!Team
!
!
!
!
!
!
!
!
!
!
!
!
!
!
!
!  
!Total
|-
!rowspan=2|1
|align=left| Matías Arezo
|align=left| Peñarol
|3|| || || || || || || || || || || || || || || 
!rowspan=2|3
|-
|align=left| José Luis Sinisterra
|align=left| Blooming
||3|| || || || || || || || || || || || || || || 
|-
!rowspan=3|3
|align=left| Miller Bolaños
|align=left| Emelec
||2|| || || || || || || || || || || || || || || 
!rowspan=3|2
|-
|align=left| Gastón Rodríguez
|align=left| Blooming
||2|| || || || || || || || || || || || || || || 
|-
|align=left| Fernando Zampedri
|align=left| Universidad Católica
|2||bgcolor="silver" colspan=15 |
|}

See also
2023 Copa Libertadores

References

 
2023
1
Copa Sudamericana